Gary Wang is an American businessperson, best known for his former role as an executive at cryptocurrency firm FTX. Before co-founding cryptocurrency exchange FTX, he worked at Google Flights, building system for aggregating prices over millions of flights. Prior to FTX's collapse he was ranked the 227th richest American in the Forbes 400, and the 431st richest person in world by The World's Billionaires.

Early life and education 
Wang grew up in New Jersey and graduated in 2011 from Cherry Hill High School East. He attended USA/Canada Mathcamp, where he met his future classmate and cofounder Sam Bankman-Fried. After high school, he attended the Massachusetts Institute of Technology, where he studied mathematics and computer science. At MIT, he was a member of Epsilon Theta, a coed fraternity.

Career 
At FTX, he served as chief technology officer. He was the second-largest shareholder of FTX at the time of the collapse of the company.

On December 18, 2022, Wang pleaded guilty in a plea bargain in the Southern District of New York to wire fraud and three counts of conspiracy involving wire, securities and commodities fraud. His lawyer, Ilan Graff, stated that "Gary has accepted responsibility for his actions and takes seriously his obligations as a cooperating witness."

References 

Year of birth missing (living people)
Living people
Massachusetts Institute of Technology alumni
American business executives
Former billionaires
Cherry Hill High School East alumni